Derek Merrin (born March 10, 1986) is an American politician serving as the state representative for the 42nd District Ohio House of Representatives. He is a Republican. The district includes western Lucas County, south 
Toledo, Maumee and Springfield Township.

Life and career
Merrin was born in Smithtown, New York, and moved to Waterville, Ohio, with his family when he was thirteen years old. He is a graduate of Monclova Christian Academy.  Politically aspirated at a very early age, Merrin was elected to the Waterville City Council at the age of nineteen. Two years later, he was elected Mayor. Along with his time in public office, Merrin also previously worked for Ohio Auditor Dave Yost and also has a small business flipping houses.

Merrin graduated from the University of Toledo with a Bachelor's of Arts, and subsequently Bowling Green State University with a Master's in Arts.  In 2012 he was named 'Thirty Conservatives Under Thirty' by Red Alert Politics.

Ohio House of Representatives
With Representative Barbara Sears term-limited in 2016, Merrin entered the race to succeed her. He would go on to win a three-way primary against Republicans Vicki Donovan-Lyle and Kevin Haddad with over 45% of the vote. A Republican leaning district, Merrin nonetheless would have faced Democrat Lauri Cooper in the 2016 general election.

Merrin received the opportunity to enter office early when Sears resigned from the seat to take a position in the administration of Ohio Governor John Kasich. As the winner of the Republican primary, Ohio House Republicans led by Speaker of the House Cliff Rosenberger appointed Merrin to serve the remainder of Sears' term. He was sworn into office on August 2, 2016.

In 2019, Merrin co-sponsored legislation that would ban abortion in Ohio and criminalize what they called "abortion murder". Doctors who performed abortions in cases of ectopic pregnancy and other life-threatening conditions would be exempt from prosecution only if they "[took] all possible steps to preserve the life of the unborn child, while preserving the life of the woman. Such steps include, if applicable, attempting to reimplant an ectopic pregnancy into the woman's uterus". Reimplantation of an ectopic pregnancy is not a recognized or medically feasible procedure.

In 2022, Merrin lost the Speaker election to Jason Stephens, who had bipartisan support, 54-43 votes.

References

External links
Ohio State Representative Derek Merrin official site

1986 births
21st-century American politicians
Bowling Green State University alumni
Businesspeople from Ohio
Living people
People from Smithtown, New York
People from Waterville, Ohio
Republican Party members of the Ohio House of Representatives
University of Toledo alumni